Gamasellus venustus is a species of mite in the family Ologamasidae.

References

venustus
Articles created by Qbugbot
Animals described in 1983